Mllojë is a settlement in the former Bërdicë municipality, Shkodër County, northern Albania. As a result of the 2015 local government reform it became part of the municipality Shkodër.

References

Bërdicë
Populated places in Shkodër
Villages in Shkodër County